The Cape Morgan Nature Reserve, part of the greater East London Coast Nature Reserve, is a coastal forest reserve in the Wild Coast region of the Eastern Cape. On its western side lies the Morgan Bay estuary, while it is flanked on the eastern side by the Cwili estuary. Nearby are the of villages of Morgan Bay and Kei Mouth. Southwest of the reserve is the Morgan Bay beach. Its shoreline is encompassed by the Kei section of the Amathole Marine Protected Area.

History 
The Cape Morgan Lighthouse was built in 1964 on the reserve, which is one of four lighthouses on the Wild Coast. In August 2020, a draft was prepared to develop accommodation facilities and a parking area for the existing Eastern Cape Parks' Conference Centre situated in the reserve.

See also 

 List of protected areas of South Africa

References 

Nature reserves in South Africa
Eastern Cape Provincial Parks